"Lockdown" is the seventeenth episode of the sixth season of the American medical drama House. It aired on April 12, 2010. This episode also marks the directorial debut of Hugh Laurie on the show.

This episode has five storylines: When the hospital is sent into lockdown mode due to a missing infant, all of the doctors must remain where they are, leaving Foreman and Taub in the file room, Wilson and Thirteen in the cafeteria playing truth or dare, House in a room with a patient (David Strathairn), and Chase with his soon-to-be ex-wife, Cameron, as Cuddy tries to help police locate the infant. This episode is one of the few instances when no medical mystery is presented, though House still deals with his "patient of the week".

Plot 

At the beginning of the episode, a father visits his wife and newborn daughter with his son. He leaves to fetch lunch for his family but upon return, the baby is missing. Cuddy orders security to keep everyone in their rooms until the baby is found and the hospital goes in lockdown.

Cameron & Chase 
Cameron comes to the hospital and confronts Chase with divorce papers in the hallway. Chase refuses to sign the papers until the two discuss their marriage. Cameron realizes that she made a mistake by coming to see Chase, but as she heads out the hospital goes under lock down, forcing the two of them to spend the duration of the investigation in close proximity.

Trapped in the clinic room with Cameron, Chase accuses Cameron of abandoning their marriage without making any effort to reach out to him. Their argument worsens until Cameron shouts out that she is not sure if she ever loved Chase. However, after calming down, Cameron comments that she is the reason their marriage didn't work, because although she loved Chase, she is an unfixable emotional mess partially due to the emotional strain she went through with her first husband while also acknowledging she might not have married her first husband if he was not terminal, revealing she has unresolved emotional commitment issues. Cameron and Chase mutually apologize for their failed marriage, and Chase then signs the divorce papers.

Later, Cameron and Chase begin reminiscing on some of their favourite memories together before and during their marriage; Cameron recalls the dance lessons they took before the wedding, and they dance to "Alison" by Elvis Costello. The two share a "goodbye" kiss, and then exploit the privacy of the lockdown to sleep with each other again.

Foreman & Taub 

Meanwhile, Taub is in the file room under the pretense of looking for a patient's records. Foreman comes down to the file room on the same errand, and the two are trapped in the file room by the lockdown. Employee records have been brought down to the file room to be digitized, so Taub and Foreman take the opportunity to look through House's records, but only find prank records House has put there including a fake malpractice settlement for a "botched penisectomy" on a patient named Lisa Cuddy. Foreman pulls out a bottle of Vicodin  he had confiscated from a patient earlier, and the two take the pills believing it will help them understand the way their boss' mind works. The two begin to playfully assault and chase one another.

As the Vicodin effect begins to wear off on Taub and Foreman, Foreman reveals he knew about the employee records, and had come down to remove an offense in his own records before it becomes digitized. Taub reads Foreman's files and discovers a minor offense from during his college years. Taub surmises that Foreman offends on purpose as he does not feel like he deserves to be among elite doctors. Foreman reads Taub's records that indicate a stellar early career, something Taub also wants to hide, as he does not feel his career has lived up to his early potential. Foreman leaves the room, deciding not to shred the record containing the offense. After Foreman exits, Taub shreds the record of the offense and replaces the file.

House 

House finds himself trapped in a room with a dying patient whose case he had previously refused to take. Initially House shows no regret or sympathy for turning down the man's case, but learns the patient has only a few hours left to live. The two bond as, in an unusual moment, House shares some sentimental emotions with his patient, whose name is never revealed.

The would-be patient refuses House's offer to be sedated with morphine for his last few hours. House deduces that since no one has visited him, he's a loner, and jokingly asks if he is a lighthouse keeper. The man tells him that he was, in fact, a Princeton University professor of classics for 26 years. House then deduces that the patient is actually waiting for someone to visit him.

The patient tells House that he is waiting for his grown daughter, with whom he hasn't spoken since she was six, to come home at 9 pm after work. At the exact hour House helps the patient to call his daughter, but no one answers the phone. The man listens to his daughter's voice recording, but does not leave a message for her. Noticing the patient's nonchalance, House quickly realizes that the man was actually waiting for the time his daughter would leave her house for work, knowing he would avoid having to speak directly with her.

House, not accepting this, redials and tells him to "say what he's gotta say". The patient leaves a final message saying he loves his daughter.

The patient then tells House he is ready to accept House's offer for sedation. After House administers the extra meds, he apologizes to the dying man for not taking his case.

Thirteen & Wilson 

Wilson and Thirteen have been trapped together in the cafeteria. Having nothing to talk about, the two have decided to play truth or dare. Thirteen tells Wilson that she has never been in a threesome, and that her father is aware of her bisexuality and is supportive. However, she is reluctant to answer certain questions about romantic relationships and therefore Wilson dares her to flash her breasts at Taub, which she describes as "the most idiotic dare ever" before later doing it anyway at the end of the episode.

Thirteen easily reads into Wilson's answers and gets him to admit that he is planning on dating someone and Thirteen probes into what else he's been doing without House's knowledge. Thirteen points out that Wilson is also reluctant to talk about romantic relationships and therefore dares Wilson to steal a dollar from the cafeteria's cash register as he is too much of a "nice boy". Wilson succeeds in taking the dollar, but then triggers the alarm bell on the register.

Feeling guilty about Wilson's anxiety, Thirteen admits she has not been playing fair: she admits that she never came out to her father and that she never told him about her disease. Wilson is amazed that Thirteen would limit herself just to cater to her father, which Thirteen points out is what Wilson does for House. Wilson tells Thirteen that he had met his first ex-wife and has been troubling himself over whether he should reunite with her. Thirteen suggests that Wilson does not have worries because of House, but because he is scared of complications that would come  out of dating an ex.

Cuddy 

As Cuddy tries to calm down the inconsolable mother, the patient demands to know why the nurses are not being interrogated. After speaking with several nurses, Cuddy turns her suspicion on to the stepson. The boy denies having moved the baby anywhere but confesses to Cuddy that he did not like the baby girl. Cuddy inadvertently discovers there are more towels stacked in the shelf above the toilet than there are supposed to be and goes to see the nurse who was previously in that room, only to realize that the nurse has been having a series of seizures and had been acting "on auto-pilot" throughout the day. Suspecting that she might have mistaken the baby for dirty towels, Cuddy rushes into the laundry room where she finds the baby in a laundry cart.

Epilogue 

In the final scenes, the baby is shown reunited with her family. Chase and Cameron are lying together, naked, and Cameron comments that she should leave. Wilson tells Thirteen he has made a dinner date with his ex-wife, but after she makes a statement that does not match up with something she said earlier, Wilson realises the possibility that nothing she has said has been true, which would be in line with her secretive nature. Foreman and Taub agree not to discuss their night with the others, and Foreman leaves. Taub stays behind and shreds the part of Foreman's file that Foreman had intended to destroy. The patient tells House he'd like to take him up on his sedation offer. Security intrudes to tell House that the lock down has ended, but House continues to stay. Just before the patient loses consciousness, House somberly tells him he is sorry he did not take his case. At the very end, Taub is at the Hospital entrance/exit, and remarks "Interesting night" to Thirteen as she walks past. Thirteen flashes her breasts at Taub as she walks by, fulfilling one of Wilson's dares. Taub reiterates "Interesting."

Production 
Director of photography Gale Tattersall used Canon EOS 5D Mark II cameras to film
the scene with newborn babies. The cameras are primarily designed for still-picture photographs, but are also capable of video recording. The production crew went on to use these cameras alone to film the entire season finale.

Critical response 
The AV Club gave the episode a B− rating.

References

External links 
 "Lockdown" at Fox.com
 

House (season 6) episodes
2010 American television episodes

fr:Lockdown (Dr House)